Simi Community Church (SCC) is located in Simi Valley, California. Its main worship service is held on Sundays at 10:00 a.m.

Further reading
Church website
Youth program website

Churches in Ventura County, California
Culture of Simi Valley, California